Robert Kinkead (June 1, 1952 – December 15, 2019) was an American chef and restaurateur based in Washington D.C.

Early life and career

Kinkead was born in Providence, Rhode Island, and grew up in Massachusetts, attending the University of Massachusetts Amherst.

Kinkead pursued a culinary career and worked in several restaurants in New England before becoming head chef and part-owner of 21 Federal in Nantucket. In 1987, he opened a sister restaurant, also named 21 Federal, in downtown Washington, D.C. This restaurant would close in early 1993 after filing for bankruptcy. In October 1993, he opened his eponymous restaurant in Foggy Bottom: Kinkead's, an American Brasserie. The restaurant was well-reviewed and was named to Esquire Magazine'''s list of the 25 best new restaurants in America. In 1995, Kinkead won the James Beard Award for "best American chef" in the Mid-Atlantic Region. In 2005, Kinkead published a cookbook, Kinkead's Cookbook: Recipes From Washington D.C.’s Premier Seafood Restaurant''.  Kinkead was known for mentoring many notable chefs in Washington, D.C., including Logan Cox, Jeff Black, Tracy O'Grady, Brendan L'Etoile, and Ris Lacoste. Kinkead's eponymous restaurant closed in December 2012. Kinkead also owned Hell Point Seafood in Annapolis, Maryland and Colvin Run Tavern in Vienna, Virginia, both of which were closed before Kinkead's. In 2004, Kinkead opened "Sibling Rivalry" in Boston with his brother, David; the restaurant closed in 2013.  In 2013, Kinkead opened a pop-up restaurant, Ancora, in the Watergate complex. Ancora closed in 2014, and Kinkead opened a more casual restaurant, Campono, next door.

In 2016, Kinkead received the Duke Zeibert Capital Achievement Award from the Restaurant Association of Metropolitan Washington.

Kinkead retired with his wife, Dianne, to Murrells Inlet, South Carolina, where he died on December 15, 2019, of heart disease and diabetes.

References 

1952 births
2019 deaths
Writers from Providence, Rhode Island
People from Murrells Inlet, South Carolina
University of Massachusetts Amherst alumni
Chefs from Massachusetts
James Beard Foundation Award winners
Chefs from Washington, D.C.
Chefs from Rhode Island